The Appellate Body of the World Trade Organization (WTOAB) is a standing body of seven persons that hears appeals from reports issued by panels in disputes brought on by WTO members. The WTOAB can uphold, modify or reverse the legal findings and conclusions of a panel, and Appellate Body Reports, once adopted by the Dispute Settlement Body (DSB), must be accepted by the parties to the dispute. The WTOAB has its seat in Geneva, Switzerland. It has been termed by at least one journalist as "effectively the supreme court of world trade".

History
The WTOAB was established in 1995 under Article 17 of the Understanding on Rules and Procedures Governing the Settlement of Disputes (DSU).

Blocking of adjudicator appointments
Under the mandate of the Trump administration, the US held up appointments to the WTOAB. David Walker (diplomat) was appointed to Chair the WTODSB with the mandate to solve this thorny problem. A journalist said that the delay was an effort to skew arbitration in the favour of the US. On 9 April 2019, US Trade Representative Robert Lighthizer said in reference to past adjudications over the policy of zeroing that the WTOAB had been "overreaching", as the government of Justin Trudeau was punished by the Trump administration over softwood lumber.

The Trump defect crystallised on 11 December 2019. In default of an WTOAB adjudication board, the EU and Canada reached an agreement whereby the WTOAB is replicated as closely as possible. Under this agreement, former WTO judges will hear appeals between the two entities after the Trump defect has been crystallized. The Trump administration has repeatedly pleaded for redress and is using the leverage at its disposal.

Multiparty Interim Appeal Arbitration
In March 2020, the European Union and 15 other WTO members agreed to a Multiparty Interim Appeal Arbitration Arrangement (MPIA). This created an alternative appellate body while the official WTO body is not functional. It mirrors the usual WTO appeal rules and can be voluntarily used between any WTO members to resolve disputes. The European Commissioner for Trade Phil Hogan said: "This is a stop-gap measure to reflect the temporary paralysis of the WTO's appeal function for trade disputes ... We will continue our efforts to restore the appeal function of the WTO dispute settlement system as a matter of priority." Since being announced, the People's Republic of China and other WTO member nations have joined the MPIA. 

A pool of ten arbitrators were announced on 31 July 2020 marking the operational start of the MPIA. The arbitrators appointed were José Alfredo Graça Lima (Brazil) Valerie Hughes (Canada), Alejandro Jara (Chile), Guohua Yang (China), Claudia Orozco (Colombia), Joost Pauwelyn (EU), Mateo Diego-Fernandez Andrade (Mexico), Penelope Ridings (New Zealand), Locknie Hsu (Singapore), and Thomas Cottier (Switzerland).

Members 

The following is a list of members of the WTOAB including their nationality and term of office.

Current 
There are currently no Members of the Appellate Body. 

See Multi-Party Interim Appeal Arbitration for an alternative arrangement used by some WTO member nations and list of appointed arbitrators.

Previous 
 Hong Zhao (lawyer), 1 December 2016 — 30 November 2020
 Hyun Chong Kim, 2016 — 2017
 Shree Baboo Chekitan Servansing, 2014 — 2018
 Seung Wha Chang, 2012 — 2016
 Thomas R. Graham, 2011 — 2015 & 2015 — 2019
 Ujal Singh Bhatia, 2011 — 2015 & 2015 — 2019
 Peter Van den Bossche, 2009 — 2013 & 2013 — 2017
 Ricardo Ramírez-Hernández, 2009 — 2013 & 2013 — 2017
 Yuejiao Zhang, 2008 — 2012 & 2012 — 2016
 Shotaro Oshima, 2008 — 2012
 Lilia R Bautista, 2007 — 2011
 Jennifer A. Hillman, 2007 — 2011
 David Unterhalter, 2006 — 2009 & 2009 — 2013
 Merit E. Janow, 2003 — 2007
 Luiz Olavo Baptista, 2001 — 2005 & 2005 — 2009
 Giorgio Sacerdoti, 2001 — 2005 & 2005 — 2009
 John Lockhart (lawyer), 2001 — 2005 & 2005 — 2006
 Arumugamangalam Venkatachalam Ganesan, 2000 — 2004 & 2004 — 2008
 Georges Michel Abi-Saab, 2000 — 2004 & 2004 — 2008
 Yasuhei Taniguchi, 2000 — 2003 & 2003 — 2007
 James Bacchus, 1995 — 1999 & 1999 — 2003
 Claus-Dieter Ehlermann, 1995 — 1997 & 1997 — 2001
 Julio Lacarte Muró, 1995 — 1997 & 1997 — 2001
 Florentino Feliciano, 1995 — 1997 & 1997 — 2001
 Christopher Beeby, 1995 — 1999 & 1999 — 2000
 Said El-Naggar, 1995 — 1999 & 1999 — 2000
 Mitsuo Matsushita, 1995 — 1999 & 1999 — 2000

References

External links
Appellate Body on WTO website 
How dispute settlement works
Jens Lehne, Crisis at the WTO: Is the Blocking of Appointments to the WTO Appellate Body by the United States Legally Justified?, Berlin/Bern 2019

World Trade Organization
International trade law
Foreign direct investment
Organizations established in 1995
Treaties entered into force in 1995